Singapore Pools (Private) Limited is a state-owned lottery subsidiary company in Singapore. As a wholly owned subsidiary of the Tote Board, it is the only operator that is legally allowed to run lotteries in Singapore.

History

Singapore Pools was incorporated on 23 May 1968 to curb illegal gambling in Singapore. It provided Singaporeans with a legal avenue to bet on lotteries, countering the rampant illegal betting syndicates that were present.

Since 1 May 2004, Singapore Pools is owned by Tote Board, a statutory board under the Ministry of Finance.

Gambling operations

Lotteries
Singapore Pools currently operates three lottery games:
 TOTO - a 6 out of 49 lottery drawn on every Monday and Thursday/Friday
 4D - a 'pick four' lottery drawn on every Wednesday, Saturday and Sunday
 Singapore Sweep - sweepstakes/raffle-style lottery drawn on the first Wednesday of every month

Sports betting
In addition, Singapore Pools is the sole legal bookmaker and totalisator for association football and motor racing betting.

Remote Gambling
On 29 September 2016, the Ministry of Home Affairs announced that Singapore Pools would be granted an exemption under the Remote Gambling Act 2014, allowing it to offer online and telephone gambling for 4D and TOTO lotteries, football and motor-racing.

See also 

 Gambling in Singapore

References

External links
 Official site

1968 establishments in Singapore
Lotteries
Gambling companies of Singapore
Singaporean companies established in 1968
Gambling companies established in 1968
Government-owned companies of Singapore
Singaporean brands